Peter Phillips (born 26 March 1942) is an Australian former shot putter and weightlifter who competed in the 1972 Summer Olympics.

References

1942 births
Living people
Australian male weightlifters
Olympic weightlifters of Australia
Weightlifters at the 1972 Summer Olympics
Australian male shot putters
Place of birth missing (living people)
20th-century Australian people
21st-century Australian people